John William Bates (August 21, 1882 – February 10, 1949) was a Major League Baseball outfielder. He played nine seasons in the majors from  until . Bates played for the Boston Beaneaters, Philadelphia Phillies, Cincinnati Reds, and Chicago Cubs in the National League, and finished his career with the Baltimore Terrapins of the Federal League. Bates hit for the cycle in 1907.

Early life
Bates was born in Steubenville, Ohio. He entered professional baseball with the 1905 Sharon Steels, a new team in the Ohio-Pennsylvania League.

Career
Bates made his major league debut in April 1906 with the Boston Beaneaters. He hit a home run in that first major league game, one of only six home runs he hit that season and one of 25 major league home runs in his career. He became a regular outfielder for Boston right away, playing 140 games that first season. 

On April 26, 1907, Bates hit for the cycle at Washington Park in Brooklyn. He was the Boston leadoff hitter, but until that game he had gotten only 8 hits in 48 at bats in the 1907 season. He hit a triple in the first at bat of the game, an infield single in the third inning, a double in the fifth inning, and a home run in the seventh inning. Boston beat Brooklyn 4-2. Bates was the third player in franchise history to hit for the cycle.

In July 1909, Bates was hitting .288, much higher than his previous season batting averages, when Boston traded him to the Philadelphia Phillies in a multiplayer deal. He then hit .293 for the Phillies that year.

Bates was involved in another multiplayer trade after 1910 season, this time to the Cincinnati Reds. He had one of his best seasons with the 1911 Reds. He hit .292 that year and, largely because his walk total ballooned to 103, he had an on base percentage of .415. His last major league season was 1914, which he split between the Reds, the Chicago Cubs, and the Baltimore Terrapins of the Federal League. In 1154 games, Bates recorded 1087 hits, 25 home runs and 417 RBI with a .278 batting average. 

From 1915 to 1918, Bates returned to the minor leagues, playing mostly in the International League.

Later life
Bates was a glassworker after retiring from baseball, and then he became a deputy sheriff for Jefferson County, Ohio. His stepson, Robert Dobbie Bates, was the county sheriff there in the late 1930s and 1940s. In 1949, Bates had a heart attack while he was shoveling snow, and he died ten days later in his native Steubenville.

See also
 List of Major League Baseball players with a home run in their first major league at bat
 List of Major League Baseball players to hit for the cycle

References

External links
, or Retrosheet

1882 births
1949 deaths
Major League Baseball outfielders
Baseball players from Ohio
Boston Beaneaters players
Boston Doves players
Cincinnati Reds players
Philadelphia Phillies players
Chicago Cubs players
Baltimore Terrapins players
Richmond Climbers players
Baltimore Orioles (IL) players
Chattanooga Lookouts players
Buffalo Bisons (minor league) players
St. Paul Saints (AA) players
Sportspeople from Steubenville, Ohio